Polhill  may refer to:

People with the family name
David Polhill (1674–1754), British politician, MP for Rochester, Bramber and Kent.
Cecil Polhill (1860–1938), English missionary.
Arthur T. Polhill-Turner (1862-1935), English missionary.

Places
Pollhill, hamlet in Kent, England
Polhill Mill, watermill near Pollhill hamlet